Paulin Mbaye is a French footballer.

Career statistics

Club

Notes

References

External links

 Profile at CosmoLeague
 Paulin Mbaye Interview

Living people
French footballers
French expatriate footballers
Association football forwards
Singapore Premier League players
Racing Besançon players
UE Engordany players
Hougang United FC players
Year of birth missing (living people)
Place of birth missing (living people)
French expatriate sportspeople in Andorra
Expatriate footballers in Andorra
French expatriate sportspeople in Singapore
Expatriate footballers in Singapore